Shelley Powers is an American author, web developer and technology architect. She works with and writes about open source, LAMP technologies and web service development, CSS/XHTML design, web graphics and the use of these technologies in the semantic web.

For her work as an author and her long-running tech weblog Burningbird, Powers was called "one of the more visible women in technology" by Virginia DeBolt of BlogHer in 2008. She has been an advocate for women in computing. She told the BlogHer interviewer, "Women are making great strides in every field of science and technology, except computers and engineering. Our numbers are decreasing every year -- a fact that should alarm not only women, but men."

Personal life
In 2020, Powers moved from St. Louis to Savannah, Georgia. She graduated from Central Washington University with a B.A. in Industrial Psychology and a B.S. in Computer science.

Career
In the late 1980s, while at Boeing, Powers began working with data and data interchange. At Boeing, she learned about the Product Data Exchange Specification (PDES). After this, she moved to Sierra Geophysics, a subsidiary of Halliburton, where she learned about POSC.

Powers's career as a computer book author began when she was working as a Powerbuilder developer in the 1990s and posted on help forums. An editor for Waite Group Press saw her posts and asked her to co-author a book on the software.

Bibliography
Learning Node (O'Reilly, 2012) 
HTML5 Media (O'Reilly, 2011) 
JavaScript Cookbook (O'Reilly, 2010) 
Learning JavaScript, 2nd edition (O'Reilly, 2008) 
Painting the Web (O'Reilly, 2008) 
Adding Ajax (O'Reilly, 2007) 
Practical RDF (O'Reilly, 2003) 
Unix Power Tools (O'Reilly, 2002) 
Essential Blogging (O'Reilly, 2002) 
Developing ASP Components (O'Reilly, 2001)

References

Sources

External links 
 Powers' Burningbird website
 
 O'Reilly profile

American technology writers
American bloggers
Living people
Place of birth missing (living people)
Year of birth missing (living people)
O'Reilly writers
21st-century American women writers
American women non-fiction writers
21st-century American non-fiction writers
American women bloggers